Carmelo Scicluna (3 August 1800 – 12 July 1888) was a Maltese prelate and count who served as the Titular Archbishop of Rhodes and Bishop of Malta from 1875 till 1888.

Archbishop Scicluna was born in Qormi on 3 August 1800. He was ordained priest in 1824 and 51 years later he was consecrated as the Bishop of Malta by His Excellency Francesco Convert, Archbishop of Reggio Calabria. He was also appointed as the Titular Archbishop of Rhodes. In 1880 Archbishop Scicluna ordered that as from that year, the traditional procession of Good Friday should be held on a Friday instead of Maundy Thursday.

Archbishop Scicluna died on 12 July 1888, at the age of 87. He had been Bishop of Malta for 13 years. His funeral took place in St John's Co-Cathedral in Valletta and was buried in St. Paul's Cathedral, Mdina. The people crowded the city to witness this important event.

References

 Catholic Hierarchy
 The Tablet
 

S
S
Scicluna
Scicluna
Scicluna